|}

The Flying Childers Stakes is a Group 2 flat horse race in Great Britain open to two-year-old horses. It is run at Doncaster over a distance of 5 furlongs and 3 yards (1,008 metres), and it is scheduled to take place each year in September.

History
The event is named after Flying Childers, a famous 18th-century racehorse bred at Carr House near Doncaster. It was established in 1967, and it was originally called the Norfolk Stakes. It was renamed when a different race became known as the Norfolk Stakes in 1973, and from this point it held Group 1 status. It was downgraded to Group 2 in 1979.

The Flying Childers Stakes is currently run on the third day of Doncaster's four-day St Leger Festival, the day before the St Leger Stakes.

Records
Leading jockey (6 wins):
 Frankie Dettori - Howick Falls (2003), Fleeting Spirit (2007), Sand Vixen (2009), Gutaifan (2015), Ardad (2016), A'ali (2019)

Leading trainer (5 wins):
 Sir Michael Stoute – Music Maestro (1977), Marwell (1980), Green Desert (1985), Raah Algharb (1994), Saddad (2001)

Winners

See also
 Horse racing in Great Britain
 List of British flat horse races
 Recurring sporting events established in 1967  – this race is included under its original title, Norfolk Stakes.

References
 Paris-Turf: 
 Racing Post:
 galopp-sieger.de – Flying Childers Stakes (ex Norfolk Stakes).
 horseracingintfed.com – International Federation of Horseracing Authorities – Flying Childers Stakes (2018).
 pedigreequery.com – Flying Childers Stakes – Doncaster.
 

Flat races in Great Britain
Doncaster Racecourse
Flat horse races for two-year-olds
1967 establishments in England